Woodard Hall is a historic mansion in Springfield, Tennessee, U.S. It was built circa 1792, and significantly remodelled by Colonel Wilie Woodard in 1854. It has been listed on the National Register of Historic Places since October 10, 1975.

References

Houses on the National Register of Historic Places in Tennessee
Houses completed in 1792
Buildings and structures in Robertson County, Tennessee
National Register of Historic Places in Robertson County, Tennessee